Lake County Airport may refer to:

 Lake County Airport (Colorado) in Leadville, Colorado, United States (FAA: LXV)
 Lake County Airport (Oregon) in Lakeview, Oregon, United States (FAA: LKV)